Gundla Brahmeshwaram Wildlife Sanctuary is a wildlife sanctuary located in the Nallamala Forest in Kurnool district of Andhra Pradesh, India. The northern part of the sanctuary is an important part of the Nagarjunsagar-Srisailam Tiger Reserve.

History
Gundla Brahmeshwaram Wildlife Sanctuary declared wildlife sanctuary on September 18, 1990. The sanctuary got its name from the Gundla Brahmeshwaram plateau.

Description
Gundla Brahmeshwara Wildlife Sanctuary is a wildlife sanctuary located in the Nallamala Forest in Kurnool district of Andhra Pradesh, India. It is located between Mantralamma kanuma and Nandi kanuma hill passes. The northern part of the sanctuary is an important part of the Nagarjunsagar-Srisailam Tiger Reserve. The Gundlakamma River flows through the sanctuary.

Flora and fauna
353 species of plants including ten critically endangered species are seen here. The mammals in the Gundala Brahmeshwara Sanctuary includes langurs, panthers, tigers, rats, Rusty-spotted cat, Indian flying squirrel, Lesser woolly horseshoe bat, Mouse deer, Pangolin, Sambar deer, Nilgai and Bonnet macaques. In a survey conducted in 2019, 23 tigers were found in the sanctuary, of which 17 were female tigers, five were male tigers and one was a tiger cub.

Threats
The indigenous biodiversity in the Gundla Brahmeswaram Wildlife Sanctuary is under threat by many invasive plant taxa.

References

Wildlife sanctuaries in Andhra Pradesh
Protected areas of Andhra Pradesh
1990 establishments in Andhra Pradesh
Protected areas established in 1990
Eastern Ghats